Rhopalomyia lateriflori is a species of gall midge, insects in the family Cecidomyiidae.

References

Further reading

 

Cecidomyiinae
Insects described in 1908